Oswine is an Anglo-Saxon male name. It may refer to:

 Saint Oswine of Deira (killed 651)
 Oswine of Kent (floruit circa 690)

Germanic given names